Claudia María Castaños Zouain is a Dominican lawyer, notary, and news presenter.

Castaños graduated from Law in 2002, however, she works since 1998, at first in a Law Firm Castaños & Castaños, that belongs to her family, and later she launched with her husband and the Dominican lawyer Julio Alfredo Castaños Zouain their own law firm "Castaños Zouain".
Since 2013, Castaños is anchorwoman at NCDN, a broadcast news network. and Since 2014 she has been a weekly collaborator of "Telenoticias", a primetime news broadcast on the Telesistema channel, with her Audience segment with Claudia Castaños. His incursion into the media aims to bring legal issues to the public, in an understandable and enjoyable.

Media 
Radio
Magazine jurídico (95.7 FM)

Television
Enfoque matinal (CDN, channel 37)
Audiencia con Claudia Castaños (Telesistema, channel 11)

External links

Sources

External links

 

Living people
1979 births
People from Santo Domingo
Dominican Republic people of Lebanese descent
Dominican Republic people of Spanish descent
Dominican Republic journalists
Dominican Republic television presenters
21st-century Dominican Republic lawyers
Dominican Republic women journalists
Dominican Republic women lawyers
Dominican Republic women television presenters
White Dominicans